Happy Channel may refer to:

Happy Channel (Italian TV channel)
Happy Channel (Romanian TV channel)